Freda Foh Shen (born April 25, 1948) is an American actress. She is best known for the voice of Fa Li in the 1998 Disney animated film Mulan and its 2004 direct-to-video sequel Mulan II, and for playing Anne Lee on 9-1-1 (2019-present).

Early life
Foh Shen was born in Atlanta, Georgia, on April 25, 1948, to Chinese parents.

Career
In 1982, Foh Shen played Lady Nijō in Caryl Churchill's play Top Girls at the New York Shakespeare Festival. In 1990, she played Carmen in Jean Genet's play The Balcony at the Hudson Guild Theater in New York City.

In addition to her theater performances, she played the role of Chinese American ceramist Jade Snow Wong in the 1976 PBS historical drama Jade Snow. Since the beginning of the 1980s, Foh Shen has appeared in several television series, including The Cosby Show, Adult Math, Renegade, Party of Five, JAG, 7th Heaven, 24, Desperate Housewives, Cracker, and Boston Legal. She has also appeared in movies including Crossing Delancey (1988), Basic Instinct (1992), Planet of the Apes (2001), The Ladykillers (2004), and a starring role in 2005's Red Doors.

By 2007, she had already had recurring roles in three television series: as Mrs. Lee on Gideon's Crossing, as Dr. Chao on Everwood, and as Dr. Yolanda Perrin on Close to Home. She is also known for her role as Dr. Noriko Weinstein in the crime drama Silk Stalkings. Most recently, she appeared in a 2018 episode of Magnum P.I., and landed a recurring role on the 2019 series 9-1-1.

As a voice actress, Foh Shen has provided the voices of Fa Li in Mulan (1998) and Mulan II (2004), the Chinese food lady in Dude, Where's My Car? (2000), Admiral Alice Liu in the 2002 video game Star Trek: Bridge Commander, and the Narrator in The Mummy: Tomb of the Dragon Emperor (2008).

Filmography

Film

Television

Video games

References

External links

American film actresses
American actresses of Chinese descent
American television actresses
American voice actresses
20th-century American actresses
21st-century American actresses
Living people
1948 births
Actresses from Atlanta
American stage actresses